Eugoa turbida is a moth of the family Erebidae first described by Francis Walker in 1862. It is found on Borneo. The habitat consists of lowland forests.

References

turbida
Moths described in 1862